Three Musicians is the title of two similar oil paintings by Spanish artist Pablo Picasso. They were both completed in 1921 in Fontainebleau near Paris, France, and exemplify the Synthetic Cubist style; the flat planes of color and "intricate puzzle-like composition" giving the appearance of cutout paper with which the style originated. These paintings each colorfully represent three musicians wearing masks. Two of the musicians are wearing costumes of the popular Italian theater Commedia dell'arte.

The more famous version features a Pierrot on the left with a clarinet, a Harlequin in the middle with a guitar and a singing monk on the right holding sheet music sitting at a table on a dark brown stage. Under the table lies a dark brown dog. The dog is mostly hidden, but his tail is shown between the Harlequin’s legs, his body under the Pierrot's pants, and 2 front legs on the left side. In the second painting, Pierrot and Harlequin have changed places, with the monk remaining to their right. 

The Harlequin  believed to represent Picasso, the Pierrot Guillaume Apollinaire, and the monk Max Jacob, respectively.  Apollinaire and Jacob, both poets, had been close friends of Picasso during the 1910s.  However, Apollinaire died of the Spanish flu in 1918, while Jacob decided to enter a monastery in 1921.

One version is in the permanent collection of the Museum of Modern Art (MoMA) in New York City; the other version is in the Philadelphia Museum of Art.

See also
 Crystal Cubism

Notes

1921 paintings
Cubist paintings
Musical instruments in art
Paintings by Pablo Picasso
Paintings in the collection of the Museum of Modern Art (New York City)
Paintings in the collection of the Philadelphia Museum of Art